The Patriarchate of Peć Monastery or the Patriarchal Monastery of Peć, is a medieval Serbian Orthodox monastery located near the city of Peja, Kosovo. Built in the 13th century, it became the residence of Serbian Archbishops. It was expanded during the 14th century, and in 1346, when the Serbian Patriarchate of Peć was created, the Monastery became the seat of Serbian Patriarchs. The monastery complex consists of several churches, and during medieval and early modern times it was also used as mausoleum of Serbian archbishops and patriarchs. Since 2006, it is part of the "Medieval Monuments in Kosovo", a combined World Heritage Site along with three other monuments of the Serbian Orthodox Church.

The monastery is ecclesiastically administrated by the Eparchy of Raška and Prizren, but it has special (stavropegial) status, since it is under direct jurisdiction of the Serbian Patriarch whose title includes Archbishop of Peć. The monastery church is unique in Serbian medieval architecture, with three churches connected as one whole, with a total of four churches.

Geography 
The monastery complex is located near Peć, in the Metohija region, near the border with Montenegro. It is situated by the Pećka Bistrica, at the entrance of the Rugova Canyon. A morus nigra tree, 750-years-old, is preserved in the monastery yard, called Šam-dud (sr), planted by Archbishop Sava II between 1263 and 1272.

History 
The monastery is located at the edges of an old Roman and Byzantine Siperant. The monastery complex, consisting of four churches, of which three churches connected as one whole, was built in the first third of the 13th century, 1321–24, and 1330–37. It is presumed that the site became a metochion (land owned and governed by a monastery) of the Žiča monastery, the seat of the Serbian Archbishopric at that time, while Archbishop Sava (d. 1235) was still alive. In the first third of the 13th century, Archbishop Arsenije I (s. 1233–63) had the Church of the Holy Apostles built on the north side. That church was decorated on Arsenije's order in ca. 1250 or ca. 1260. In 1253, Arsenije I moved the Serbian Church seat from Žiča to Peć amid foreign invasion, to a more secure location, closer to the centre of the country. The Serbian Church seat was then shortly returned to Žiča in 1285, before being moved to Peć in 1291, again amid foreign invasion. Archbishop Nikodim I (s. 1321–24) built the Church of St. Demetrius on the north side of the Church of the Holy Apostles, while his successor, Archbishop Danilo II (s. 1324–37) built the Church of the Holy Mother of God Hodegetria and the Church of St. Nicholas on the south side. In front of the three main churches, he then raised a monumental narthex. In the time of Archbishop Joanikije II, around 1345, the hitherto undecorated Church of St. Demetrius was decorated with frescoes. Serbian Emperor Stefan Dušan (r. 1331–1355) raised the Serbian Archbishopric to the patriarchal status in 1346, thus creating the Serbian Patriarchate of Peć.

During the 14th century, small modifications were made to Church of the Holy Apostles, so some parts were decorated later. From the 13th to the 15th century, and in the 17th century, the Serbian Archbishops and Serbian Patriarchs were buried in the churches of the Patriarchate. In 1459–63, after the death of Arsenije II, the patriarchate became vacant upon abolishment by the Ottoman Empire but was restored in 1557 during the reign of sultan Suleiman the Magnificent. The re-establishment was done under the advice of grand vizier Sokollu Mehmed Pasha, while some of Bulgarian eparchies were also placed under its jurisdiction. Georgije Mitrofanović (1550–1630) painted new frescoes in the Church of St. Demetrius in 1619–20. In 1673–74 painter Radul painted the Church of St. Nicholas. In the early 18th century, and especially during and after the Austro-Russian–Turkish War (1735–1739), the patriarchate became the target of the Phanariotes and the Ecumenical Patriarchate of Constantinople, whose goal was to place the eparchies of the Serbian Patriarchate under its own jurisdiction. In 1737 the first Greek head of the Serbian Patriarchate was appointed after the intervention of Alexandros Mavrocordatos, who labeled the Serb leadership "untrustworthy". In the following years the Phanariotes embarked on policy initiatives that led to the exclusion of Serbs in the succession of the patriarchate, which was eventually abolished in September 1766.

Period of Ottoman rule in the region ended in 1912. At the beginning of the First Balkan War (1912-1913), army of the Kingdom of Montenegro entered into Peć. By the Treaty of London (1913) the region of Peć was officially awarded to Montenegro and the Monastery of Peć again became an episcopal seat. Bishop Gavrilo Dožić of Peć (future Serbian Patriarch) initiated works on monastery complex, but those efforts were halted due to the breakout of the First World War (1914) and subsequent Austro-Hungarian occupation of Montenegro, including Peć. War ended in 1918, and Montenegro joined Kingdom of Serbia and South Slavic provinces of former Austria-Hungary to form the Kingdom of Serbs, Croats and Slovenians. In 1920, structural unity of Serbian Orthodox Church was restored, and Serbian Patriarchate was renewed, with traditional primatial seat in the Patriarchal Monastery of Peć. Since then, all Serbian Patriarchs were enthroned in the Monastery.  Major reconstruction works in the Monastery were undertaken during 1931 and 1932. 

In 1947, the Patriarchate of Peć was added to Serbia's "Monument of Culture of Exceptional Importance" list, and on 13 July 2006 it was placed on UNESCO's World Heritage List as an extension of the Visoki Dečani site which was overall placed on the List of World Heritage in Danger.

Restoration of the complex began in June 2006 and was completed in November 2006. The main aim was to protect the complex from the weather, as well as to repair the inner walls and exterior appearance. Two previously unknown frescoes were uncovered on the north facade of the Church of St. Demetrios, of a Serbian queen and nobleman. In 2008, the church facades were painted red, as Žiča, which led to some reactions. The sites were protected by the Kosovo Force until 2013, when the Kosovo Police took over responsibility.

Mausoleum
Serbian Orthodox archbishops and patriarchs were ktetors of the monastery, and these were buried in its churches. The monastery is the greatest mausoleum of Serbian religious dignitaries. The monastery holds the relics of Serbian church leaders (most of whom are saints) Arsenije (s. 1233–63), Sava II (s. 1263–71), Jevstatije I (s. 1279–86), Nikodim I (s. 1316–24), Danilo II (s. 1324–37), Joanikije II (s. 1338–54), Jefrem (s. 1375–79; 1389–92), Spiridon (s. 1380–89) and Maksim I (s. 1655–74).

Complex

Churches

The three main churches with domes (Holy Apostles, St. Demetrius and Hodegetria) are connected with each other, linked by a joint monumental narthex. A smaller church, without a dome, is by the side of the Hodegetria Church.

Gallery

See also 
:Category:Burials at the Patriarchate of Peć (monastery)
List of Serb Orthodox monasteries
Archbishops of Peć and Serbian Patriarchs
Serbs in Kosovo
Tourism in Kosovo
 Kosovo: A Moment in Civilization

Annotations

References

Sources

External links 

  
Patriarchate of Peć- virtual tours and photo collections of the Blago Fund 
 
 Official site of Serbian Orthodox Eparchy of Raška and Prizren - old
New official site of Serbian Orthodox Eparchy of Raška and Prizren
Official site of the Serbian Orthodox Church
Serbian Unity Congress
Map - Area under jurisdiction of Patriarchate of Peć in the 17th century

Cultural Monuments of Exceptional Importance (Serbia)
Medieval Serbian Orthodox monasteries
Serbian Orthodox monasteries in Kosovo
World Heritage Sites in Serbia
Monuments and memorials in Kosovo
Medieval Serbian sites in Kosovo
Christian monasteries established in the 13th century
Burial sites of Serbian Orthodox clergy
Cultural heritage of Kosovo
Patriarchate of Peć